Jan Egil Storholt (born 13 February 1949) is a former speed skater from Norway. He was born in Løkken Verk which at the time was part of the Meldal municipality.

Biography
Together with Amund Sjøbrend, Sten Stensen, and Kay Stenshjemmet, Jan Egil Storholt was one of the legendary four S-es (which sounds like "four aces" in Norwegian), four Norwegian top skaters in the 1970s and early 1980s.

He became a member of sports club Falken ("Falcon") in Trondheim. Falken was the club 1948 Olympic 1,500 m Champion Sverre Farstad and three-time 1952 Olympic Champion (on the 1,500 m, 5000 m, and 10000 m) Hjalmar Andersen had skated for.

Storholt was the Norwegian Junior Champion in 1969, but when he was almost killed in a mining accident in 1970, he was told he would probably not be able to compete at the highest levels again, and it seemed that his promising career had already come to an end. However, Storholt's determination got him back to the Norwegian top by 1972. After some of the best Norwegian speed skaters had turned professional in 1973 (and therefore also could no longer participate in the Olympic Games), Storholt suddenly was one of the best Norwegian amateurs.

It still took until 1976 for his first major international successes: After having won bronze at the European Allround Championships that year, Storholt went on to win Olympic gold on the 1,500 m in Innsbruck. This made him the third Olympic 1,500 m Champion for sports club Falken. In 1977 he became European Allround Champion and was narrowly defeated by Eric Heiden in the World Allround Championships. He won silver behind Heiden in three consecutive World Championships, and became European Allround Champion for the second time in 1979. This year he won his only Norwegian allround title as a senior.

Storholt ended his speed skating career in 1981, after having won bronze in the World Championships.

Medals
An overview of medals won by Storholt at important championships he participated in, listing the years in which he won each:

Records

World records 
Over the course of his career, Storholt skated two world records:

Source: SpeedSkatingStats.com

Personal records 
To put these personal records in perspective, the WR column lists the official world records on the dates that Storholt skated his personal records.

Note that Storholt's personal record on the 5,000 m was not a world record because Kay Stenshjemmet skated 6:56.9 at the same tournament.

Storholt was number one on the Adelskalender, the all-time allround speed skating ranking, for a total of 30 days, divided over two short periods in 1977 and 1978. He has an Adelskalender score of 163.042 points.

References 

 Eng, Trond. All Time International Championships, Complete Results: 1889 - 2002. Askim, Norway: WSSSA-Skøytenytt, 2002.
 Eng, Trond; Gjerde, Arild and Teigen, Magne. Norsk Skøytestatistikk Gjennom Tidene, Menn/Kvinner, 1999 (6. utgave). Askim/Skedsmokorset/Veggli, Norway: WSSSA-Skøytenytt, 1999.
 Eng, Trond; Gjerde, Arild; Teigen, Magne and Teigen, Thorleiv. Norsk Skøytestatistikk Gjennom Tidene, Menn/Kvinner, 2004 (7. utgave). Askim/Skedsmokorset/Veggli/Hokksund, Norway: WSSSA-Skøytenytt, 2004.
 Eng, Trond and Teigen, Magne. Komplette Resultater fra offisielle Norske Mesterskap på skøyter, 1894 - 2005. Askim/Veggli, Norway: WSSSA-Skøytenytt, 2005.
 Teigen, Magne. Komplette Resultater Norske Mesterskap På Skøyter, 1887 - 1989: Menn/Kvinner, Senior/Junior. Veggli, Norway: WSSSA-Skøytenytt, 1989.
 Teigen, Magne. Komplette Resultater Internasjonale Mesterskap 1889 - 1989: Menn/Kvinner, Senior/Junior, allround/sprint. Veggli, Norway: WSSSA-Skøytenytt, 1989.

External links
 Jan Egil Storholt at SpeedSkatingStats.com
 Personal records from Jakub Majerski's Speedskating Database
 Evert Stenlund's Adelskalender pages
 Historical World Records from the International Skating Union
 National Championships results from Norges Skøyteforbund (the Norwegian Skating Association)

1949 births
Living people
World record setters in speed skating
Norwegian male speed skaters
Olympic speed skaters of Norway
Olympic gold medalists for Norway
Speed skaters at the 1976 Winter Olympics
Speed skaters at the 1980 Winter Olympics
Olympic medalists in speed skating
Medalists at the 1976 Winter Olympics
World Allround Speed Skating Championships medalists
Sportspeople from Trondheim